The Alannah & Madeline Foundation is a national Australian charity which was launched on 30 April 1997.

The Alannah & Madeline Foundation's mission is keeping children safe from violence. The foundation cares for children who have experienced or witnessed violence and runs programs which aim to prevent violence in the lives of children. The foundation plays an advocacy role by being a voice against childhood violence.

History and organisation

Formation

The Alannah & Madeline Foundation was set up in memory of Alannah and Madeline Mikac, aged six and three, who were killed with their mother and 32 others at Port Arthur, Tasmania, on 28 April 1996.

Alannah and Madeline's father, Walter Mikac, Phil West and a small group of volunteers including Gaye and John Fidler who survived Port Arthur, established the foundation in the girls' memory, a national charity with the belief that all children should have a safe and happy childhood without being subjected to any form of violence.

On 30 April 1997, the Prime Minister of Australia, John Howard, officially administered the national launch of the Alannah & Madeline Foundation.

Organisation

The Alannah & Madeline Foundation is located in Victoria, but operates as a national charity.

The foundation's mission is keeping children safe from violence.

Logo
The foundation's logo was created using part of a family portrait drawn by Alannah Mikac, just months before she was killed at Port Arthur. The logo is Alannah and her younger sister Madeline holding hands.

Programs and services

The Alannah & Madeline Foundation cares for children who have experienced or witnessed violence and runs programs which aim to prevent violence in the lives of children. The foundation plays an advocacy role by being a voice against childhood violence.

Better Buddies

Better Buddies was launched in 2000 and is a school framework designed to create friendly and sharing school communities, in order to reduce the incidence of bullying in Australian schools. Better Buddies helps students entering their first year of primary school to feel safe, valued and connected to the school community. The school pairs new primary school students with an older student buddy.

Crown Princess Mary of Denmark, international patron of the Alannah & Madeline Foundation, has been closely involved with the Better Buddies Framework in Australia and Denmark. In 2007, Crown Princess Mary's Foundation, the Mary Foundation, introduced 'Free of Bullying' to Denmark in co-operation with Save the Children Denmark. The program was developed with inspiration from the Alannah & Madeline Foundation's Better Buddies program. The preventative anti-bullying program has now been implemented in more than 1,000 preschools and 370 schools throughout Denmark.

Buddy Bags
In 2007, the Buddy Bags program was introduced in response to continued demands to support children on their arrival to emergency accommodation, such as foster homes and refuges.

Buddy Bags are backpacks containing essential items, such as toiletries, pyjamas, socks, underwear and a pillowcase, as well as comfort items such as a book, photo frame and teddy bear.

More than 80,000 Buddy Bags have been distributed to children in emergency care throughout Australia.

Children Ahead
Children Ahead was one of the foundation's first programs. Children Ahead provides intensive support to children who have experienced violence, and has helped hundreds of children over the past 10 years to recover from traumatic events and violent circumstances. Qualified staff work directly with children and families to support their emotional, educational and social needs, as well as psychological wellbeing and any overall health concerns.

eSmart Schools
eSmart is a system that helps schools deal with the serious issues of bullying, cyberbullying, cybersafety, and equips students with the skills and knowledge they need for smart, safe and responsible use of technology.

The Alannah & Madeline Foundation worked on the development of the program for three years in collaboration with the RMIT School of Education. The foundation also consulted with the Australian Media and Communication Authority (ACMA), the Department of Education, Employment and Workplace Relations (DEEWR), state education departments' student wellbeing divisions, National Centre Against Bullying (NCAB) members, and cybersafety and technology industry experts across Australia.

In 2010, DEEWR provided $3 million to pilot eSmart in 150 schools across Australia.

In 2011, the Victorian and Queensland Governments partnered with the foundation to make eSmart available to all their state government schools for free, and in Victoria, some independent and catholic schools that are classified as disadvantaged.

eSmart Libraries
The Alannah & Madeline Foundation, in partnership with the Telstra Foundation, will work with Australia's 1,500 public libraries to develop and roll out eSmart Libraries – a cybersafety system to better equip and connect local communities with the skills they need for the smart, safe and responsible use of technology.

eSmart Digital Licence
The eSmart Digital Licence is an online challenge which uses quizzes, videos and games to prepare Australian children (aged ten and over) to be smart, safe and responsible digital citizens.

In 2015, Google partnered with the foundation to make the Digital Licence available to every grade 6 student in Australia.

National Centre Against Bullying
The National Centre Against Bullying (NCAB) is an initiative of The Alannah & Madeline Foundation and is a body of experts who work closely with school communities, government and industries to advise and inform the Australian community on the issue of childhood bullying, cyberbullying and cybersafety, and the creation of safe schools and communities.

Events

National Buddy Day
National Buddy Day is a joint initiative of The Alannah & Madeline Foundation and the National Australia Bank (NAB).  National Buddy Day is designed to celebrate friendship and highlight the important issue of bullying.

Starry Starry Night
Starry Starry Night is the foundation's annual gala ball and has become an institution on the Melbourne charity gala ball calendar. Funds raised from the event directly support the work of the foundation.

The event attracts more than 1,000 guests alongside celebrities who individually host tables and perform a variety of singing and dancing acts.

eSmart Week 
A week of community and online events held in partnership with schools, libraries and other organisations, to teach and promote smart, safe and responsible behaviours online.

Patrons and ambassadors

See also
 The Hance Family Foundation, a similar children's organization in the United States of America founded by Jackie and Warren Hance, whose three daughters were murdered by their aunt in the 2009 Taconic State Parkway crash.

References

Charities based in Australia
Child safety
Foundations based in Australia
Non-profit organisations based in Victoria (Australia)
Murdered Australian children
Port Arthur massacre